Faletuiatua Lufilufi Taulealo (born 1947) is a former Samoan international lawn bowler.

Bowls career
Taulealo has represented Samoa at two Commonwealth Games, in the singles at the 2002 Commonwealth Games and the pairs at the 2006 Commonwealth Games .

She won a pairs bronze medal with (Manuia Porter) at the 2007 Asia Pacific Bowls Championships in Christchurch.

References

1947 births
Living people
Bowls players at the 2002 Commonwealth Games
Bowls players at the 2006 Commonwealth Games
Samoan bowls players